Illinois Tool Works Inc. or ITW is an American Fortune 200 company that produces engineered fasteners and components, equipment and consumable systems, and specialty products.  It was founded in 1912 by Byron L. Smith and has built its growth on a 'small-wins strategy' based on decentralization, simplicity, customer-focused innovation, and acquisitions.

Today, it employs approximately 45,000 people in hundreds of businesses across 53 countries, and is based in Glenview, Illinois, a suburb of Chicago.

ITW has more than 18,000 granted and pending patent applications worldwide. The company typically ranks in the top 100 of patent issuers in the U.S.

ITW subsidiaries
ITW comprises a number of subsidiaries. Notable brands include Hobart, Miller Electric, Paslode, Foster Refrigerator, Brooks Instrument . In August 2018, U.S. Tax Court Judge Albert G. Lauber determined that ITW owed no tax on over $356 million in repatriated funds from its foreign subsidiaries because the transactions had been sufficiently structured as debt.

The following is a list of ITW subsidiaries:

Illegal exports 
The United States Department of Commerce imposed a $142,000 civil penalty on Illinois Tool Works in 2000, to settle allegations that the company illegally exported chemicals to Brazil on seven occasions between March 1994 and October 1997 without the required licenses and making false or misleading statements on Shipper's Export Declarations. Illinois Tool Works agreed to pay the penalty. $37,000 was suspended as part of the settlement. The chemicals exported can be used for commercial purposes and in the making of chemical weapons as well.

References

External links
 

Tool manufacturing companies of the United States
Manufacturing companies based in Illinois
Companies based in Glenview, Illinois
Manufacturing companies established in 1912
1912 establishments in Illinois
Companies listed on the New York Stock Exchange